Adolphson is a surname originating in Scandinavia. Notable people with the surname include:

 Edvin Adolphson (1893–1979), Swedish actor and director
 Kristina Adolphson (born 1937), Swedish film actor, daughter of Edvin
 Olle Adolphson (1934–2004), Swedish writer, singer and songwriter, son of Edvin
 Peter H. Adolphson (born 1957), American politician

See also 
 Adolphson & Falk, a Swedish synthpop band
 Håkan Adolfsson (born 1971), Swedish bandy player

References